Tourism in Tunisia is an industry that generates around 9.4 million arrivals per year in 2016, 2017, 2018, 2019 & 2020, which makes it one of the most visited countries in Africa. Tunisia has been an attractive destination for tourists since the beginning of the 1960s. 

Among Tunisia's tourist attractions are its cosmopolitan capital city of Tunis, the ancient ruins of Carthage, the Muslim and Jewish quarters of Djerba, and coastal resorts outside Monastir. According to The New York Times, Tunisia is "known for its golden beaches, sunny weather and affordable luxuries."

History

According to Garrett Nagle in his book Advanced Geography, Tunisia's tourist industry "benefits from its Mediterranean location and its tradition of low-cost package holidays from Western Europe."  The development of tourism dates back to 1960 through the joint efforts of government and private groups. In 1962, tourism, with 52,000 entries and 4,000 beds, had a revenue of two million dollars and becomes the main source of foreign exchange in the country. 

Tunisia is also an attractive destination for its huge number of important festivals. The majority of these festivals occur in summer such as International Festival of Carthage which is the most important festival in the Arab world hosting stars and bands from all over the world, and Tabarka Jazz Festival.

Until recently, Tunisia's main attraction was on its northeast coastline around Tunis; however, the Seventh National Development Plan of 1989 created several new tourist areas including the resort at Port-el-Kantaoui. The tourism sector now represents 6.5% of Tunisia's GDP and provides 340,000 jobs of which 85,000 are direct jobs or 11.5% of the working population with a high share of seasonal employment.

France, Germany, Italy and the United Kingdom are the four traditional tourist markets, though Tunisia has decided since the last few years to open its tourism industry to new markets such as Russia and China.  From 2003 to 2004, it regained tourists, and 2007 saw arrivals increasing by 3 percent over that of 2006.

Tourism in Tunisia suffered severe blows following the Bardo National Museum attack and the Sousse attack in 2015, but Tunisia managed to retrieve its position as one of the top destinations in Africa and the Mediterranean shortly afterwards, reaching in 2018 numbers exceeding those of 2010 by 6 percent, and a record of 8.3 million visitors.

The consequences of the COVID-19 pandemic on Tunisia's tourism sector have been described as catastrophic. In 2020 earnings were down 60% to US$563 million.

Attractions
Tunisia's attractions are of different types according to the region: 
Tunis, the largest city and capital and its suburbs mainly Le Bardo, and the northern suburbs of Carthage, Sidi Bou Said, La Goulette and La Marsa 
Bizerte and its surroundings 
The North-West for its forests in Ain Draham and picturesque coastal mountains close to Tabarka
The Cap Bon: Hammamet, Nabeul and surroundings
The Sahel, Tunisia: the beach resorts of Sousse, Monastir, Mahdia
The religious city of Kairouan, the former capital of the country, the fourth capital of Islam and the city of the oldest mosque in Africa Great Mosque of Kairouan
The island of Djerba 
The Sahara and the touristic and relaxing cities of Douz, Tozeur and the famous Tataouine, one of the locations of the Star Wars saga.

UNESCO World Heritage Sites
Tunisia is home to eight UNESCO World Heritage Sites as well 13 others in the tentative list including the island of Djerba for its cultural and religious diversity.

Museums

This is a list of some important museums in Tunisia:

Resorts
This sector is popular mainly on the east coast, totaling more than 95% of beds. The following is a list of the largest resorts and the percentage of nights out of the total: 

 Sousse-Monastir-Mahdia (36%)
 Nabeul-Hammamet (24%)
 Djerba-Zarzis (40%)
 Tunis-Zaghouan (10%)
 Tabarka-Aïn Draham (2%)

Golf

Tunisia is also a pioneer golfing destination in the Mediterranean. It offers world-class golf courses available year-round due to the sunny and pleasant weather. Among the most important golf courses of the country:
Yasmine Valley in Hammamet
Citrus (La Foret) in Hammamet
El Kantaoui (Panorama) in Port El Kantaoui 
Tabarka golf course
Citrus (Les Oliviers) in Hammamet
Residence Tunis in Gammarth 
Flamingo Monastir 
El Kantaoui (Sea) in Port El Kantaoui 
Djerba (La Mer and Les Palmiers)
Carthage golf course in La Soukra

Marinas
Tunisia is one of the African countries that has the most marinas. Its yachting infrastructure attracts mostly European tourists who flee the harsh winter in their home countries to enjoy the pleasant weather and relatively warmer sea in Tunisia. The country is planning to create additional marinas in the coming years such as the one in the new modern economic center of Tunis Financial Harbor.

The existing marinas are 8 from the north to the south of the coast:
Yasmine Hammamet Marina in Hammamet 
Bizerte Marina in Bizerte 
El Kantaoui Marina in Port El Kantaoui 
Sidi Bou Said Marina
Gammarth Marina
Tabarka Marina 
Marina Cap in Monastir 
Djerba  Marina

Theme parks
Tunisia offers several theme parks and most importantly water parks in each of the main cities and tourist resorts and among them:

 Carthage Land in Hammamet 
 Aqua Palace in Sousse 
 Aqua Splash in Sousse  
 Aqua Land in Yasmine Hammamet  
 Dreamy Sea Waterpark in Hammamet
 Aqua land in Berges du Lac, Tunis  
 Big Splash in Djerba  
 Le Pirate in Djerba

Desert and film sets

The Tunisian desert represents a major tourist destination in the country. The oases add some greenness and shades to the aridity of the pristine environment and the hot sun of the Saharan dunes.

Since the Arab invasions on Tunisia, a growing population settled in the arid environment of the Numedian regions Medenine, Tataouine and Tozeur where they created oases as havens and also souks and old towns as new urban centers.

Tozeur benefited from its extremely authentic old town and its souks to develop the tourism industry especially for the winter and spring seasons. Several hotels and maisons d’hote opened in Tozeur as well as some upscale units such as the world-famous Thai brand, Anantara in 2019 which is ranked as the best hotels in the world.

Taking a horse carriage to visit the oases and to taste the delicious Deglet Nour as well as going to Chott el Djerid, the largest salt lake in the Sahara Desert are must-do activities in the region.
The canyons and rocky mountains of the south as in Mides and the Berber village of Chebika, Tozeur can be visited while taking the old and luxurious Lézard rouge train for a few ride hours stopping at many natural stations.

Georges Lucas's Star Wars made of Tataouine and Matmata, Tunisia's underground houses tourist destinations. 
Numerous other Hollywood movies were filmed in the Tunisian south, such as The English Patient.

Festivals and nightlife

During the summer, Tunisia becomes the venue of a multitude of festivals welcoming Arab and world-famous stars as International Festival of Carthage, Hammamet International Festival and Djem Symphonic Festival. 
Outdoor bars and nightclubs have made of Tunisia's metropolitan areas very lively during the whole day in the summer and at night especially in Gammarth   and Hammamet.

Shopping
Souks and historical handicraft markets are present in the old towns of the country. They used to represent the commercial center of each city but they are now major tourist attractions. The old souks of Tunis  for example have separated sections for each type of handicraft such as for the Chechia, the jewelry, etc.

Modern shopping infrastructure has also developed in the recent years attracting big international brands. Despite the creation of many new shopping malls such as Tunisia Mall in Berges du Lac, Mall of Sousse and Azur City Mall in the southern suburb of Tunis, they are all located in the capital city or in the coastal touristic cities.

New developments
In recent years, ecotourism, spas and medical tourism are emerging into Tunisia's tourist scene and growing very fast. According to the former Minister of Tourism Ahmed Smaou, "The medical tourism has a great future ahead of us."

Statistics
In 2000, there were 197,400 hotel beds in roughly 95,977 rooms with an occupancy rate at 56%. 5,057,193 travellers came to Tunisia that year. That year, tourist expenditures were nearly $1.5 billion. According to 2002 US Department of State estimates, the average daily cost of staying in Tunis or Carthage was $146, compared to $114 in other areas of Tunisia.

A large number of tourists to Tunisia come from Eastern Europe, and the nationalities of major tourist countries is shown here: Libyans (1,472,411 visitors), French (1,234,735), Algerians (945,324), Germans (547,403), Italians (464,323) and British (350,693). There were 1,251,251 domestic tourists staying across the country for 2.75 million nights in 2006.

Recent years

See also

Index of Tunisia-related articles
Visa policy of Tunisia

References

External links
 Official website of the Office of Tunisian tourism

 
Tunisia